Buzenval is a station on line 9 of the Paris Métro, on the Rue de Buzenval in the 20th arrondissement.  The station was opened on 10 December 1933 with the extension of the line from Richelieu - Drouot to Porte de Montreuil. The street is named after the commune of Buzenval, which is another name for Rueil-Malmaison. This is where the Battle of Buzenval of the Siege of Paris, part of the Franco-Prussian War took place on 19 January 1871.

The "Tarzan" of "Buzenval" was the nickname of Laurent Dauthuille, a boxer of the 1950s.

Station layout

References
Roland, Gérard (2003). Stations de métro. D’Abbesses à Wagram. Éditions Bonneton.

Paris Métro stations in the 20th arrondissement of Paris
Railway stations in France opened in 1933